The Embassy of North Macedonia in Kyiv is the diplomatic mission of North Macedonia in Ukraine.

History 

Relations between Ukraine and North Macedonia were established on 23 July 1993, when Ukraine recognized the independence of the Republic of Macedonia. Diplomatic relations were established 20 April 1995 by exchange of notes between the Ministry of Foreign Affairs of Ukraine and the Ministry of Foreign Affairs of Macedonia. In December 1997 the Embassy of the Republic of Macedonia was opened in Kyiv. Diplomatic mission of Ukraine in the Republic of Macedonia opened June 2000. Ukraine opened an embassy in the Republic of Macedonia during November 2001.

Previous Ambassadors
 Vlado Blazhevski (1997 - 2003)
 Martin Huleski (2003 - 2008)
 Ilija Isajlovski (2008 - 2009)
 Aco Spacenoski (2010–2014)
 Mr.Stole Zmejkoski (2014–present)

See also 
 North Macedonia–Ukraine relations
 Foreign relations of North Macedonia
 Foreign relations of Ukraine
 Diplomatic missions in Ukraine
 Diplomatic missions in North Macedonia

References

External links 
 Embassy of North Macedonia in Kyiv
 Ministry of Foreign Affairs of Ukraine

Diplomatic missions in Kyiv
Kyiv
North Macedonia–Ukraine relations